Salamina or Kοullοuri is the largest city and a former municipality on Salamina Island in Greece. Since the 2011 local government reform it is part of the municipality of Salamina, of which it is the seat and a municipal unit.

It is part of the Islands regional unit of the Attica region. The city lies in the northwestern part of the island. It had a population of 25,370 inhabitants at the 2011 census, some of them are Arvanites. The population of the municipal unit was 31,776 in 2011. It includes several towns, the largest of which are Aiánteio (pop. 4,860), Stenó (198), Kanákia (206), Peristéria (206), Batsí (235), Kolónes (153), and Pérani (226).

Subdivisions

The municipal unit Salamina is subdivided into the following communities (constituent villages in brackets):
Salamina (Salamina, Elliniko, Batsi, Steno)
Aianteio (Aianteio, Dimitrani, Kanakia, Kolones, Maroudi, Perani, Peristeria)

Climate

According to the meteorological station of the National Observatory of Athens and Harokopio University, Salamina has a hot semi-arid climate with mild winters and very hot summers.

See also
Battle of Salamis
Ajax the Great

References

External links
Official website 

Populated places in Islands (regional unit)